You Can't Hide Your Love Forever is the debut album by Scottish post-punk band Orange Juice, released in 1982 by Polydor. The title was derived from a line in the song "Hi Dear," by Jonathan Richman & The Modern Lovers.  It was re-released by Domino in 2014.

Track listing
All tracks composed by Edwyn Collins, except where indicated.
 "Falling and Laughing" – 3:51
 "Untitled Melody" – 2:04
 "Wan Light" (James Kirk) – 2:23
 "Tender Object" – 4:25
 "Dying Day" – 3:00
 "L.O.V.E. Love" (Al Green, Mabon "Teenie" Hodges, Willie Mitchell) – 3:32
 "Intuition Told Me (Part 1)" – 1:09
 "Upwards And Onwards" – 2:27
 "Satellite City" – 2:43
 "Three Cheers For Our Side" (James Kirk) – 2:50
 "Consolation Prize" – 2:50
 "Felicity" (James Kirk) – 2:34
 "In a Nutshell" – 4:15

Personnel
Orange Juice
 Edwyn Collins – guitar, vocals, songwriting
 James Kirk – guitar, vocals, songwriting
 David McClymont – bass guitar
 Steven Daly – drums, percussion
with:
Michael McEvoy – keyboards
Esther Byrd, Jackie Challenor, Lorenza Johnson – background vocals
Technical
Adam Kidron – producer; assisted by Orange Juice
Phil Bodger – engineer
Steve Bush – sleeve design
Jill Furmanovsky – cover photography

References

1982 debut albums
Orange Juice (band) albums
Albums produced by Adam Kidron
Polydor Records albums